Hunger is the sixteenth studio album by the American folk singer/songwriter Janis Ian, released on September 30, 1997.  It is the follow-up to her 1995 album Revenge.  Recording was held in various studios in the spring of 1997.  Production for the album was initially handled by an unnamed producer, but disagreements between Ian and the producer caused that producer to leave and Jeff Balding was brought in to finish production work.

Track listing

Personnel

Production

Janis Ian – producer
Jeff Balding – producer, mixing
Ani DiFranco – producer ("Searching for America")
Andrew Gilchrist – mixing ("Searching for America")
Simon Renshaw – management
Karen Krattigner Sternberg – management
Sonny Mediana – art direction and design

Musicians

Janis Ian – vocals, acoustic guitar
Cyro Baptista – percussion
Kevin Breit – electric and National Steel guitars, bazoukis
David Piltch – upright bass
Ani DiFranco – background vocals, bass, sampling ("Searching for America")
Andrew Gilchrist – electric guitar ("Searching for America")
Andy Stochansky – drums, percussion ("Searching for America") 
Steve Brewster – drums ("Honor Them All")
Dann Huff – electric guitar ("Honor Them All")
Randy Leago – accordion ("Honor Them All")
Terry McMillian – percussion ("Honor Them All")
Glenn Worf – upright bass ("Honor Them All")
Ron Huff – ("Getting Over You")

References

1997 albums
Janis Ian albums
Windham Hill Records albums